Thrasippus of Athens was, in 348 BC, one of the six executors to Plato's will.

References

Diogenes Laërtius, Life of Plato. Translated by C.D. Yonge.

Family of Plato
4th-century BC Athenians